Banda District may refer to:

 Banda District, India, a district in Uttar Pradesh, India
 Banda District, Ghana, a district in the Bono Region, Ghana
 Banda District (Republic of the Congo), a district in the Niari Department, Republic of the Congo

District name disambiguation pages